Borgarbyggð is a municipality in the west of Iceland.

The biggest township in the municipality is Borgarnes, with a population of 1,887 inhabitants. Other densely populated areas in the municipality include Bifröst, Hvanneyri, Kleppjárnsreykir , Reykholt and Varmaland.

Education

There are two universities in Borgarbyggð; Bifröst University in Bifröst and the Agricultural University of Iceland in Hvanneyri. There is a secondary school in Borgarnes, Menntaskóli Borgarfjarðar. The municipality runs two primary schools; one is in Borgarnes and the other has three separate facilities in Hvanneyri, Kleppjárnsreykir and Varmaland. The municipality also runs a music school in Borgarnes.

References